Pervis Milroy Goes (born 3 September 1986), known better as Milroy Goes is an Indian film director and screenwriter of Portuguese descent from Goa His film Welcome M1LL10NS was eligible for the 91st Academy Awards in Best Picture Academy Award but was not nominated in any categories. Goes is also known for directing music videos for A R Rehman’s singer Shashaa Tirupati for major record labels in India.

Goes is the first to introduce digital cinema in Goa with his debut theatrical film “The Victim”.  He is also the Co-founder of the Premium Café brand in Goa, “Café Bom Gosto.”

Early life
Goes is one of ten siblings born in his family. His parents are of Indian and Portuguese descent.

Career
In 2008, Goes's debut short film was screened at IFFI Chota Cinema. He was then mentored by a Frenchman, Anthony Coombs-Humpreys, and his wife Christine. Later under their mentorship he made a short film with a Bollywood actor Deepraj Rana.

In 2012, his directorial debut in Konkani cinema was with the film The Victim. Goes also made an ad film with an Australian cricketer Brett Lee. He has directed music videos, one of which was featured on the channel VH1 India.

In 2015, While he was a jury member  for the first edition of the 'Goa Short Film Carnival' by Goa Talkies. his short film "Peon – Ek Chaprasi" was premiered on the closing day, he was recognized by then Chief Minister of Goa, Laxmikant Parsekar

In 2017, he wrote and directed the feature film WELCOME M1LL10NS and in 2018, the film was released at Laemmle's Music Hall in Beverly Hills. It went on to qualify for the 91st Academy Awards in the General Category.

In 2018, He was actively involved in social cause with an NGO in Goa, "Human Touch Foundation" volunteering as jury member for the short film competition "Get High On Life".

In January 2019, Goes continued to support the NGO for a good cause, volunteered to be part of a panel discussion at Men Against Violence and Abuse (MAVA) in collaboration with the department of social work, Don Bosco College, Panaji and  hosted the second edition of Samabhav, a travelling film festival in Panjim.

Filmography

Awards and nominations

References

External links
 
 
 

1986 births
Living people
Film directors from Goa
Konkani-language film directors
People from South Goa district
Hindi-language film directors
21st-century Indian film directors
Indian people of Portuguese descent